The Sumgayit 2014-15 season is Sumgayit's fourth Azerbaijan Premier League season. They will also participate in the Azerbaijan Cup and it is their first season with Ilham Yadullayev as their manager.

On 5 August 2014, Sumgayit changed the name of their stadium from Mehdi Huseynzade Stadium to Kapital Bank Arena for sponsorship reasons.

Squad

Out on loan

Transfers

Summer

In:

Out:

Winter

In:

Out:

Friendlies

Competitions

Azerbaijan Premier League

Results summary

Results

League table

Azerbaijan Cup

Squad statistics

Appearances and goals

|-
|colspan="14"|Players who appeared for Sumgayit no longer at the club:

|}

Goal scorers

Disciplinary record

Notes
Qarabağ have played their home games at the Tofiq Bahramov Stadium since 1993 due to the ongoing situation in Quzanlı.
Araz-Naxçıvan were excluded from the Azerbaijan Premier League on 17 November 2014, with all their results being annulled.

References 

Sumgayit
Sumgayit FK seasons